Scânteia may refer to:
Scînteia, a former newspaper in Romania
Scânteia, Ialomița, a commune in Ialomița County, Romania
Scânteia, Iași, a commune in Iași County, Romania
 Scânteia, a village in Jariștea Commune, Vrancea County, Romania
Scânteia (river), a tributary of the Miletin in Botoșani and Iași Counties, Romania